Neil Rañeses (born March 1, 1981 in Cebu, Philippines) is a Filipino former professional basketball player.

He previously played in the Philippine Basketball Association with the Coca-Cola Tigers, the same team that drafted him 11th overall in the 2005 PBA draft.  He also had stints in the amateur Philippine Basketball League, the most recent being with the Magnolia Purewater Wizards.

External links
PBA Team Rosters (Old link)

1981 births
Filipino men's basketball players
Living people
Basketball players from Cebu
Philippine Patriots players
Cebuano people
Small forwards
Power forwards (basketball)
Powerade Tigers players
UV Green Lancers basketball players
Powerade Tigers draft picks